The Maritime Telegraph and Telephone Company (MT&T, later MTT) was founded around 1910 in Halifax, Nova Scotia and provided telecommunications to Nova Scotia until 1998 when it merged with the Island Telephone Company, NBTel, and NewTel Communications to form Aliant (now Bell Aliant).

In 1977, MT&T moved into a new headquarters building in downtown Halifax, the Maritime Centre.

References

External links
 History of MTT
 Aliant

Companies based in Halifax, Nova Scotia
Telecommunications companies of Canada
Bell Aliant
Telegraph companies
1910 establishments in Nova Scotia
Telecommunications companies established in 1910
Companies disestablished in 1998
1998 disestablishments in Nova Scotia
Canadian companies established in 1910